Alfred Dick  (December 6, 1927 – March 7, 2005) was a German politician and school teacher, representative of the Christian Social Union of Bavaria. Between 1962 and 1994 he was a member of the Landtag of Bavaria. He served as Bavarian State Minister for the Environment (1977–1990).

See also
List of Bavarian Christian Social Union politicians

References

Christian Social Union in Bavaria politicians
1927 births
2005 deaths
Ministers of the Bavaria State Government
Members of the Landtag of Bavaria
People from Passau
German schoolteachers
Grand Crosses with Star and Sash of the Order of Merit of the Federal Republic of Germany